Inland is an unincorporated community and census-designated place in northwestern Clay County, Nebraska, United States. As of the 2010 census it had a population of 62. Although Inland is unincorporated, it has a post office, with the ZIP code of 68954.

Geography

Demographics

History
Inland was founded circa 1878. The name is descriptive. A post office was established at Inland in 1879.

References

Census-designated places in Clay County, Nebraska
Census-designated places in Nebraska